Peter Hüttner (born 10 December 1945, in Gothenburg) is a Swedish actor and writer.

Hüttner began his theatrical career at Folkteatern in Gothenburg 1968 and was subsequently employed on Atelierteatern. He is trained at the stage school in Malmö 1969–73. He has worked on Helsingborg City Theatre, Stockholm City Theatre, Gothenburg City Theatre, Riksteatern and Folkteatern. Hüttner is best known for his role as Oljelund in the films about the police Martin Beck.

Filmography
Beck – Levande begravd (2010)
Beck – I Guds namn (2007)
Beck – Det tysta skriket (2007)
Beck – Den svaga länken (2007)
Beck – Den japanska shungamålningen (2007)
Beck – Gamen (2007)
Beck – Advokaten (2006)
Beck – Flickan i jordkällaren (2006)
Beck – Skarpt läge (2006)
Beck – Sista vittnet (2002)
Beck – Pojken i glaskulan (2002)
Beck – Annonsmannen (2002)
Beck – Okänd avsändare (2002)
Beck – Enslingen (2002)
Beck – Kartellen (2002)
Beck – Mannen utan ansikte (2001)
Beck – Hämndens pris (2001)
Hur som helst är han djävligt död (2000)
Beck – Spår i mörker (1998)
Beck – The Money Man (1998)
Beck – Monstret (1998)
Beck – Öga för öga (1998)
Beck – Vita nätter (1998)
Beck – Pensionat Pärlan (1997)
Beck – Mannen med ikonerna (1997)
Beck – Lockpojken (1997)
 1995 – Vita lögner
Pariserhjulet (1993)
Den stora badardagen (1991)
 1990 – Apelsinmannen
 1988 – Varuhuset
 1987 – Undanflykten
Morrhår och ärtor (1986)
 1985 – Anden i flaskan
Varning för Jönssonligan (1981)
En kärleks sommar (1979)
 1978 – Bevisbördan
The Tempest (1974)

References

External links

1945 births
Living people
People from Gothenburg
Swedish people of German descent
Swedish male actors
Swedish-language writers